The Church of the Annunciation also known as The Carmelite Church is a rich Baroque priory church of the Priory of Our Lady of Mount Carmel located in Mdina, Malta.

History
Records mention that on the site of the present church, stood another church dedicated to the Nativity of Mary. Other sources mention that the chapel was dedicated to the Virgin of the Fortress (della Rocca). The chapel and the surrounding area was given to the Carmelites in the 1650s. The church was built between 1660 and 1675 on the designs of Mederico Blondel des Croisettes.

After the earthquake of 1693 which destroyed many important buildings, notably the medieval cathedral of St Paul, the cathedral chapter moved to the Carmelite church until 1702 when the new cathedral was rebuilt. Moreover, the church also served as the parish church during this time. 

During the French occupation the church was ransacked by the French where valuables were stolen to fund Napoleon's wars. However, it is said that on one particular occasion, as the French were on their way to steal the church's damask, some rebels locked the church doors and a boy went up to the spire to sound the alarm. Consequently, this event gave birth to the resistance against the French.

Works of art
The interior is enriched with baroque sculpture and paintings by notable artists such as Mattia Preti, Stefano Erardi, Michele Bellanti and Giuseppe Calì. The ornately carved and gilded wooden frame around the titular painting is the work of Pietro Paolo Troisi, and the processional statue of Our Lady of Mount Carmel the work of Maltese sculptor Andrea Imbroll.

See also
Catholic Church in Malta

References

Carmelite churches in Malta
17th-century Roman Catholic church buildings in Malta
Mdina
National Inventory of the Cultural Property of the Maltese Islands